Agelena poliosata is a species of spider in the family Agelenidae, which contains at least 1,350 species . It was first described by Wang in 1991 and is native to China.

References

poliosata
Spiders described in 1991
Spiders of China